Tonini & Bramblet was an Oklahoma City-based architectural firm which designed a number of courthouses in Oklahoma.

It was a partnership of Otto Hofman Tonini (1873-1971), who was born in Kentucky of German immigrant parents, and of Robert (Lorn) Bramblet.  Partners in 1931 no longer included Bramblet but did include T. Wyman Thompson.  The firm's office was in the Terminal Building in Oklahoma City.

The firm was later named Hair, Tonini & Bramblet.

A number of the firm's works are listed on the U.S. National Register of Historic Places.

Works include (with attribution):
Oklahoma
Alfalfa County Courthouse (1921), Grand Ave. Cherokee, Oklahoma (Tonini & Bramblet), NRHP-listed
Cotton County Courthouse, 301 N. Broadway Walters, Oklahoma (Tonini & Bramblet), NRHP-listed
Major County Courthouse, Courthouse Sq. Fairview, Oklahoma (Tonini & Bramblet), NRHP-listed
Okmulgee County Courthouse, 300 W. 7th St. Okmulgee, Oklahoma (Hair, Tonini & Bramblet), NRHP-listed
Payne County Courthouse, 606 S. Husband St. Stillwater, Oklahoma (Hair, Tonini & Bramblet), NRHP-listed
Tillman County Courthouse, Gladstone and Main Sts. Frederick, Oklahoma (Tonini & Bramblet), NRHP-listed
Kansas
Crawford County Courthouse, 111 E. Forest, Courthouse Square Girard, KS (Tonini and Bramlet), NRHP-listed, only Kansas building known to be designed by the firm.

The firm sued Mayes County, Oklahoma for breach of contract regarding a courthouse design for Mayes County, which was not built.  The Supreme Court of Oklahoma ruled on the case in 1931.

References

Companies based in Oklahoma
American architects
Architects from Oklahoma City
Defunct architecture firms of the United States